The 8th Southeast Asia Basketball Association Championship was held in Medan, Indonesia from 6–9 July 2009. It was to determine the 2 representatives of SEABA in the 2009 FIBA Asia Championship.

Preliminary round

Final

Awards

Final standings

References 

2009
International basketball competitions hosted by Indonesia
2009–10 in Asian basketball
2009–10 in Philippine basketball
2009–10 in Malaysian basketball
2009–10 in Indonesian basketball
2009–10 in Singaporean basketball